Yakari is a 2005 animated television series based on the Franco-Belgian comics of the same name created by Job and Derib. The show debuted on 24 December 2005 on France 3.

Synopsis

This series features the adventures of Yakari, a little  Sioux Native American , and his faithful steed, Little Thunder, in the great prairie. Yakari has the ability to communicate with all animals, a gift that was transmitted to him by his totem, the Great Eagle.

Episodes

Season 1

Season 2

Season 3

Season 4

Season 5

References

External links
 

2005 French television series debuts
2014 French television series endings
2000s French animated television series
2010s French animated television series
Australian Broadcasting Corporation original programming
French children's animated action television series
French children's animated adventure television series
Native Americans in popular culture
Television shows about Native Americans
2000s Belgian television series
France Télévisions children's television series
French-language television shows
Belgian children's animated action television series
Belgian children's animated adventure television series
2000s Western (genre) television series
Television shows adapted into comics
Animated television series about children